Karl Hans Berger (born March 30, 1935 in Heidelberg, Germany) is a German jazz pianist, composer, and educator.

Career
Berger played piano in Germany when he was ten and worked in his teens at a club in Heidelberg. He learned modern jazz from visiting American musicians, such as Don Ellis and Leo Wright. During the 1960s, he started playing vibraphone and received a doctoral degree in musicology. He worked as a member of Don Cherry's band in Paris. When the band went to New York City to record Symphony for Improvisers, he recorded his debut album as a leader.

With Ornette Coleman and Ingrid Sertso, he founded the Creative Music Studio in Woodstock, New York, in 1972, to encourage students to pursue their own ideas about music. Berger considered Coleman his friend and mentor, and like Coleman he was drawn to avant-garde jazz, free jazz, and free improvisation.

He has worked with Carla Bley, Dave Holland, Lee Konitz, John McLaughlin, Sam Rivers, Pharoah Sanders, Gunther Schuller, Clifford Thornton, the Mingus Epitaph Orchestra, and the Globe Unity Orchestra. He collaborated with Bill Laswell as musical arranger and conductor, thus contributing to albums by Jeff Buckley, Better Than Ezra, Buckethead, Natalie Merchant, Sly & Robbie, Angélique Kidjo, Hōzan Yamamoto, and Shin Terai.

Discography

As leader
 From Now On (ESP Disk, 1967)
 Tune In (Milestone, 1969)
 We Are You (Calig, 1972)
 With Silence (Enja, 1972)
 All Kinds of Time (Sackville, 1976)
 Interludes (FMP, 1977)
 Changing the Time (Horo, 1977)
 Just Play (1976) (Quark, 1979)
 New Moon (Palcoscenico, 1980)
 Live at the Donaueschingen Music Festival (MPS, 1980)
 Transit (Black Saint, 1987)
 Karl Berger + Paul Shigihara (L+R/Bellaphon, 1991)
 Around (Black Saint, 1991)
 Sudpool Jazz Project II: Moon Dance (L+R/Bellaphon, 1992)
 Crystal Fire (Enja, 1992)
 Conversations (In+Out, 1994)
 No Man Is an Island (Douglas Music, 1997)
 Stillpoint (Double Moon, 2002)
 Strangely Familiar (Tzadik, 2010)
 Synchronicity (Nacht, 2012)
 After the Storm (FMR, 2013)
 Gently Unfamiliar (Tzadik, 2014)
 Moon (NoBusiness, 2015)
 Live at the Classical Joint (Condition West, 2017)
 In a Moment (Tzadik, 2018)
 Conjure (True Sound, 2019)

As sideman
With Don Cherry
 Togetherness (Durium, 1966)
 Live at Cafe Montmartre 1966 Vols. 1–3 (ESP Disk, 1966)
 Symphony for Improvisers (Blue Note, 1967)
 Eternal Rhythm (MPS, 1969)
 Multikulti (A&M, 1990)

With Bill Laswell
 Jazzonia (Douglas Music, 1998)
 Filmtracks 2000 (Tzadik, 2001)
 Points of Order (Innerhythmic, 2001)

With Ivo Perelman
 Reverie (Leo, 2014)
 The Art of the Improv Trio Vol. 1 (Leo, 2016)
 The Hitchhiker (Leo, 2016)

With others
 Better Than Ezra, How Does Your Garden Grow? (Elektra, 1998)
 Carla Bley, Escalator Over the Hill (JCOA, 1971)
 Anthony Braxton, Creative Orchestra Music 1976 (Arista, 1976)
 Buckethead, Giant Robot (CyberOctave, 2000)
 Jeff Buckley, So Real: Songs from Jeff Buckley (Legacy/Columbia, 2007)
 Neneh Cherry, Broken Politics (Smalltown Supersound, 2018)
 Chocolate Genius, Black Music (Everlasting, 1998)
 Coheed and Cambria, Good Apollo I'm Burning Star IV (Columbia, 2005)
 Lajos Dudas, Talk of the Town (Double Moon, 2000)
 Slide Hampton, Jazz Live Trio with Guests (TCB, 2013)
 Theo Jorgensmann, Fellowship (hatOLOGY, 2005)
 Kalaparusha, Kalaparusha (Trio, 1977)
 Hans Koller, Big Sound Koller (Sonorama, 2016)
 Lee Konitz, The Lee Konitz Duets (Milestone, 1968)
 Lee Konitz, Seasons Change (Circle, 1980)
 Rolf Kuhn & Joachim Kuhn, Transfiguration (SABA, 1967)
 John Lindberg, Duets 1 (Between the Lines, 2006)
 Machine Gun, Machine Gun (MU, 1988)
 Magpie Salute, The Magpie Salute (Eagle, 2017)
 Albert Mangelsdorff, Albert Mangelsdorff and His Friends (MPS, 1971)
 Kesang Marstrand, Our Myth (North Node, 2011)
 John McLaughlin, Where Fortune Smiles (Dawn, 1971)
 Charles Mingus, Epitaph (Columbia, 1989)
 Ryan Montbleau, Patience On Friday (Blue's Mountain, 2007)
 Musica Elettronica Viva, United Patchwork (Horo, 1978)
 Robert Musso, Innermedium (DIW, 1999)
 Pete Namlook, Polytime (Fax, 1998)
 Rich Robinson, Through a Crooked Sun (Circle Sound 2011)
 Roswell Rudd, Blown Bone (Emanem, 2006)
 Frederic Rzewski, Attica/Coming Together/Les Moutons De Panurge (Opus One, 1974)
 Alan Silva, Skillfullness (ESP Disk, 1969)
 Sly and Robbie, Rhythm Killers (Island, 1987)
 Swans, The Burning World (UNI, 1989)
 Swans, Forever Burned (Young God, 2003)
 Aki Takase, So Long, Eric! Homage to Eric Dolphy (Intakt, 2014)
 John Tchicai, 2 X 2 (Taso, 2001)
 Clifford Thornton, Freedom & Unity (Third World, 1969)
 Alexander von Schlippenbach, Globe Unity (SABA, 1967)
 Alexander von Schlippenbach, Globe Unity 67 & 70 (Atavistic, 2001)
 Marzette Watts, Marzette Watts and Company (ESP Disk, 1968)
 Barney Wilen, Zodiac (Vogue, 1966)
 Rachael Yamagata, EP (Private Music, 2003)

References

External links 
 Creative Music Studio
 Sertso Studio
 

1935 births
Living people
Musicians from Heidelberg
People from the Republic of Baden
Post-bop pianists
Post-bop composers
German jazz composers
Male jazz composers
ESP-Disk artists
Enja Records artists
MPS Records artists
Milestone Records artists
Avant-garde jazz pianists
Avant-garde jazz composers
German musicologists
German jazz pianists
German jazz vibraphonists
People from Woodstock, New York
20th-century German male pianists
21st-century German male pianists
Academic staff of the Frankfurt University of Music and Performing Arts
Machine Gun (band) members
Sackville Records artists
FMR Records artists
Tzadik Records artists
Black Saint/Soul Note artists
NoBusiness Records artists
Jazz vibraphonists